Michael Creed (born 29 June 1963) is an Irish Fine Gael politician who has been a Teachta Dála (TD) for the Cork North-West constituency since 2007, and previously from 1989 to 2002. He previously served as Minister for Agriculture, Food and the Marine from 2016 to 2020.

Early and personal life
He is the son of the former TD and Minister of State, Donal Creed. Born in Macroom, County Cork, in 1963. Creed was educated at St. Colman's College, Fermoy and De La Salle College, in Macroom. He went on to third level at University College Cork and the College of Commerce, Rathmines. His qualifications are a Bachelor of Arts, Higher Diploma of Education and a Diploma in Legal Studies.

Political career
Creed was elected Cork County Council in 1985 for the local electoral area of Bandon. He served on that authority until 2007. He was Chairman of Cork County Council from 2005 to 2006. He was first elected to Dáil Éireann at the 1989 general election and retained his seat at each election until losing it at the 2002 general election, to his Fine Gael running mate Gerard Murphy. He was Chairman of the Dáil Small Business and Services Committee from 1995 to 1997. He was party Spokesperson on Education, Arts, Culture and the Gaeltacht in 1994, Health 1989 to 1993, Youth and Sport 1993 to 1994. After regaining his Dáil seat at the 2007 general election, at the expense of Gerard Murphy, he was party Spokesperson on Agriculture, Fisheries and Food from 2007 to 2010. At the 2011 general election he held his seat after topping the poll in the first preference vote.

In June 2010, he supported Richard Bruton's leadership challenge to Enda Kenny. Following Kenny's victory in a motion of confidence, Creed was not re-appointed to the front bench.

Upon Fine Gael forming a coalition government with the Labour Party in March 2011, to the surprise of many Creed remained as a backbench TD. He remained as a backbencher during the entire duration of the 31st Dáil.

He was again elected to the Dáil at the 2016 general election. Following the formation of a Fine Gael minority government in May 2016, Creed was appointed to the cabinet as Minister for Agriculture, Food and the Marine. He was re-appointed when Leo Varadkar became Taoiseach in June 2017. He stayed in office until the formation of a coalition government in 2020 of Fianna Fáil, Fine Gael and the Green Party in June 2020, when he was not appointed to cabinet.

References

External links

Michael Creed's page on the Fine Gael website

1963 births
Living people
Alumni of Dublin Institute of Technology
Alumni of University College Cork
Fine Gael TDs
Irish farmers
Local councillors in County Cork
Members of the 26th Dáil
Members of the 27th Dáil
Members of the 28th Dáil
Members of the 30th Dáil
Members of the 31st Dáil
Members of the 32nd Dáil
Members of the 33rd Dáil
Ministers for Agriculture (Ireland)
Politicians from County Cork
People from Macroom